SXE may refer to:
 East Sussex, county in England, Chapman code
 West Sale Airport, IATA airport code "SXE"
 
 sXE may refer to:
 Straight edge, subculture of hardcore punk